Aurora Fútbol Club is a Guatemalan professional football club. They are based in Guatemala City and play their home matches in the Estadio Cementos Progreso. Once one of the most powerful teams in the country and a traditional rival of fellow local teams Municipal and Comunicaciones, the team has now been relegated to a lower division, although they remain the third-most successful team in Guatemalan football. Their uniform is black and yellow vertical striped shirt and black shorts.

History
The club is owned by the Guatemalan Army and was founded on April 14, 1945, as Aurora de la Guardia de Honor, a name that was shortened to Aurora F.C. in 1946. Having joined the Liga Mayor in 1947, they have won eight league titles, 10 second place finishes and two international titles.

During the 1960s decade, they won their first three national league titles, which came in a span of four years, in the 1964, 1966, and 1967–68 seasons. The three championships came under Uruguayan coach Rubén Amorín. In 1975, they won their fourth league title, repeating the feat in 1978. The 1970s also brought international success, as they won the Copa Fraternidad in 1976 by beating some of the best teams in Central America, including defending champions Platense, thanks in good part to the attacking duo Pennant and René Morales each contributing with a tournament-high seven goals to the successful run. Aurora would go on to win another Copa Fraternidad title in 1979. Two more league titles came in the 1980s, one in 1984 and the other in 1986, the former while being managed by coach Rubén Amorín and the latter under Jorge Roldán, who also led them to another title in the 1992–93 season, the eighth and last championship won by Aurora to date.

In 2005, they shocked local fans and media when they were relegated to Primera División after 60 years of playing in the top flight.

List of coaches

 Rubén Amorín (1958–71), (1984)
 Néstor Valdez Moraga (1973)
 Jorge Roldán (1974–75), (1979), (1986–87), (1992–93), (1996–97)
  Omar Muraco (1975–76)
 Marvin Rodríguez (1978)
 Juan Quarterone (1980)
 Carlos Alberto Mijangos (1988)
 José Luis Estrada (1994–95)
 Felipe Antonio Carías (2000)
 Alfredo López (2001)
 Mariano Aguirre (2007)
  Gustavo Faral (2009)
 Tomas Castillo
 Diego Cerutti (2021)
 Gustavo Machaín (2021–2022)
 Gabriel Castillo (2022–)

Honours
Liga Nacional de Guatemala titles: 8
1964, 1966, 1967–68, 1975, 1978, 1984, 1986, 1992–93

Primera División de Ascenso titles: 1
Apertura 2020Copa de Guatemala: 41958–59, 1967–68, 1968–69, 1984Copa Fraternidad: 21976, 1979
Runner-up (3): 1972, 1975, 1983

Performance in CONCACAF  competitionsCONCACAF Cup Winners Cup: 1 appearance1994 – FinalistCampeón Copa Interclubes UNCAF: 2'1976, 1979

References

External links
 Unofficial Website
  Aurora FC profile – Guatemala, 100 años de fútbol – special report by Prensa Libre'' – www.prensalibre.com

 
Football clubs in Guatemala
Association football clubs established in 1945
Football clubs in Guatemala City
1945 establishments in Guatemala
UNCAF Interclub Cup winning clubs